Grangerellidae is an extinct family of gastropods in the superfamily Orthalicoidea (according to the taxonomy of the Gastropoda by Bouchet & Rocroi, 2005). This family has no subfamilies.

Genera 
Genera within the family Grangerellidae include:
 † Grangerella Cockerell, 1915 - the type genus of the family Grangerellidae
 † Protoboysia Cockerell, 1914

References

External links 
 Grangerellidae at the Paleobiology Database